Müritz [ˈmyʁɪts] comes from the Slavic word morcze = "small sea" and may refer to:

 Müritz, the largest inland lake within Germany
 Landkreis Müritz, a former county in Mecklenburg-Vorpommern, Germany
 Müritz National Park in the Mecklenburg Lake District, Germany
 Graal-Müritz a village in the county of Rostock in Mecklenburg-Vorpommern, Germany
 Klein Müritz, in the borough of Ribnitz-Damgarten in the county of Vorpommern-Rügen in Mecklenburg-Vorpommern, Germany

See also:
 Müritzsee, a lake south of the Müritz